Parque Alcalde is a park in Guadalajara, in the Mexican state of Jalisco.

References

Guadalajara, Jalisco
Parks in Jalisco